Jean Ladd (February 26, 1923 – September 29, 2009) was an American pitcher and left fielder who played in the All-American Girls Professional Baseball League. She batted and threw right handed.

Born in Prairie View, Illinois, Jean Ladd appeared in fewer than ten games for the Kenosha Comets during the 1951 season.

Afterwards, Ladd returned home and worked as a high school teacher for 23 years. Following her retirement, she became an avid golfer and bowler and also was very active in social activities.

In 1988, Jean Ladd received further recognition when she became part of Women in Baseball, a permanent display based at the Baseball Hall of Fame and Museum in Cooperstown, New York which was unveiled to honor the entire All-American Girls Professional Baseball League.

She died in 2009 in Libertyville, Illinois, at the age of 86.

References 

1923 births
2009 deaths
All-American Girls Professional Baseball League players
Kenosha Comets players
Baseball players from Illinois
People from Lake County, Illinois
20th-century American women
20th-century American people
21st-century American women